Johann Sebastian Bach composed the church cantata  (What should I ask of the world) 94 in Leipzig for the ninth Sunday after Trinity and first performed it on 6 August 1724. It is a chorale cantata, based on the hymn by Balthasar Kindermann (1664) on a melody by Ahasverus Fritsch.

History and words 

The cantata is the ninth chorale cantata of Bach's second annual cycle in Leipzig, composed for the Ninth Sunday after Trinity. The prescribed readings for the Sunday were from the First Epistle to the Corinthians, a warning of false gods and consolation in temptation, and from the Gospel of Luke, the parable of the Unjust Steward. The cantata is based on the chorale in eight stanzas of the poet Balthasar Kindermann (1664) on a melody by Ahasverus Fritsch. An unknown poet transformed the chorale to a cantata text, keeping stanzas 1, 3, 5, 7 and 8, expanding 3 and 5 by inserted recitatives, and rewriting 2, 4 and 6 to arias. The cantata text is only generally connected to the readings, referring to the statement in the Gospel "for the children of this world are in their generation wiser than the children of light". The poet expresses turning away from the transient world to Jesus.

Bach first performed the cantata on 6 August 1724.

Scoring and structure 

The cantata in eight movements is scored for four vocal soloists—soprano, alto, tenor and bass–and a four-part choir, flauto traverso, two oboes, two violins, viola, organ and continuo.

 Chorale: 
 Aria (bass): 
 Recitative + Choral (tenor): 
 Aria (alto): 
 Recitative + Choral (bass): 
 Aria (tenor): 
 Aria (soprano): 
 Chorale:

Music 

The opening chorus is dominated by the concertante flauto traverso in figurations reminiscent of a flute concerto. Bach wrote virtuoso music for flute here for the first time in a cantata for Leipzig. Probably an excellent flute player was available. Bach seems to have written again for him in Herr Christ, der einge Gottessohn, BWV 96. Two themes of the opening ritornello of twelve measures, one for flute, the other for the strings and oboes, are derived from the melody of the hymn "O Gott, du frommer Gott" (1648). The chorale is sung by the soprano. The lively music in D major seems to represent the "world" rather than its negation.

In the bass aria with continuo, comparing the world to "haze and shadow", tumbling motives illustrate vanishing, falling and breaking, whereas long held notes speak of stability ("").

In the third movement the tenor sings the chorale in rich ornamentation, the accompaniment of two oboes and continuo is similar to the (later)  in the Christmas Oratorio, #7 of Part I.

The following alto aria, calling the world a "snare and false pretense", is dominated again by the flute. The arias for tenor and soprano are set in dance rhythms, Pastorale and Bourrée, describing the "world" rather than disgust of it. The cantata is concluded by the last two stanzas of the chorale in a four-part setting.

Recordings 

 Die Bach Kantate Vol. 46, conductor Helmuth Rilling, Gächinger Kantorei, Bach-Collegium Stuttgart, Helen Donath, Else Paaske, Aldo Baldin, Wolfgang Schöne, Hänssler 1974
 J. S. Bach: Das Kantatenwerk – Sacred Cantatas Vol. 5, conductor Nikolaus Harnoncourt, Tölzer Knabenchor, Concentus Musicus Wien, Paul Esswood, Kurt Equiluz, Philippe Huttenlocher, Teldec 1979
 J. S. Bach: Complete Cantatas Vol. 11, conductor Ton Koopman, Amsterdam Baroque Orchestra & Choir, Sibylla Rubens, Annette Markert, Christoph Prégardien, Klaus Mertens, Antoine Marchand 1999
 J. S. Bach: Cantatas BWV 9, 94 & 187, conductor Sigiswald Kuijken, La Petite Bande, Midori Suzuki, Magdalena Kožená, Knut Schoch, Jan van der Crabben, Deutsche Harmonia Mundi 1999
 Bach Edition Vol. 11 – Cantatas Vol. 5, conductor Pieter Jan Leusink, Holland Boys Choir, Netherlands Bach Collegium, Marjon Strijk, Sytse Buwalda, Nico van der Meel, Bas Ramselaar, Brilliant Classics 1999
 J. S. Bach: Cantatas Trinity Cantatas I, conductor John Eliot Gardiner, Monteverdi Choir, English Baroque Soloists, Katharine Fuge, Daniel Taylor, James Gilchrist, Archiv Produktion 2000
 J. S. Bach: Cantatas Vol. 22 – Cantatas from Leipzig 1724 VI, conductor Masaaki Suzuki, Bach Collegium Japan, Yukari Nonoshita, Robin Blaze, Jan Kobow, Peter Kooy, BIS 2003

References

Sources 

 
 Was frag ich nach der Welt BWV 94; BC A 115 / Chorale cantata (9th Sunday after Trinity) Bach Digital
 Cantata BWV 94 Was frag ich nach der Welt history, scoring, sources for text and music, translations to various languages, discography, discussion, Bach Cantatas Website
 Was frag ich nach der Welt English translation, University of Vermont
 Was frag ich nach der Welt text, scoring, University of Alberta
 Chapter 10 BWV 94 Was frag ich nach der Welt? / Why enquire of this world? Julian Mincham, 2010
 Luke Dahn: BWV 94.8 bach-chorales.com

Church cantatas by Johann Sebastian Bach
1724 compositions